Aeolotrocha paroptila is a species of moth in the family Gelechiidae. It was described by Anthonie Johannes Theodorus Janse in 1960. It is found in Mozambique and South Africa.

References

Aeolotrocha
Moths described in 1960
Moths of Africa